Hearts and Minds may refer to:

Conflict
 Winning hearts and minds, the idea of persuading enemies instead of defeating them by force
 Hearts and Minds (Vietnam War), a strategy used by the South Vietnamese and United States governments
 Hearts and minds (Iraq), a US public relations campaign and 2004 congressional hearing during the Iraq War

Film
 Hearts and Minds (film), a 1974 documentary film about the Vietnam War
 Hearts and Minds, a 1995 film featuring Danny Keogh

Television

Series
 Hearts and Minds (1995 TV series), a British drama series
 Hearts and Minds (1996 TV programme), a 1996–2012 British current affairs programme

Episodes
 "Hearts and Minds" (Justice League)
 "Hearts and Minds" (Lost)
 "Hearts and Minds" (The Outer Limits)
 "Hearts and Minds" (That's So Raven)

Other uses
 Hearts and Minds (album), a 2000 album by Susannah McCorkle
 Hearts and Minds, a 2009 novel by Amanda Craig
Hearts and Minds: The Untold Story of the Great Pilgrimage and How Women Won the Vote, a 2018 book by Jane Robinson